Génova may refer to:
 Spanish spelling of the city of Genoa, Italy
 Génova, Quindío, a municipality in the department of Quindío, Colombia
 Génova, Quetzaltenango, a municipality in the department of Quetzaltenango, Guatemala
 Génova 13, location of the national headquarters of People's Party of Spain (Partido Popular)

See also
 Genova (disambiguation)

it:Génova